The men's 4 × 400 metres relay event at the 1936 Olympic Games took place between August 8 and August 9.

Results

Heats

The fastest two teams in each of the three heats advanced to the final round.

Heat 1

Heat 2

Heat 3

Final

References

Men's 4x400 metre relay
Relay foot races at the Olympics
Men's events at the 1936 Summer Olympics